Vivir para amar, is a Venezuelan telenovela produced by Antonio Franco for TVes. It is the first telenovela produced in the studios of TVes.

Fedra López and Jorge Reyes star as the main protagonists, Vanessa Mendoza  and Daniel Terán as co-protagonists.

Written by César Cierra, directed by José Gregorio Scala and José Luis Limanski, and produced by Antonio Franco as executive producer and Vladimir Salazar as General producer.

Cast

Main 

Fedra López as Yolanda
Jorge Reyes as Julio Gavaldón
Vanessa Mendoza as Diana
Yemaya León as Young Diana
Daniel Terán as Simón
Alcedo Zerpa as Young Simón

Secondary 

Damián Genovese as Rodrigo
Gigi Zanchetta as América
Reina Hinojosa as María Teresa
Luis Fernando Sosa as Gustavo
Carlos Guillermo Haydon as Hulk
Adolfo Cubas as Pedraza
Pablo Martín as Padre Ricardo
Félix Loreto as Tony
Dulce María Vallenilla as Valentina
Samuel Campos as Lucas
Virginia Urdaneta as Alcira
Erick Noriega as Miltón
Roberto Giray as Charlie
Jennifer Flores as Paty
Jean Carlos López as Pablito

Recurring cast 
Antonio Machuca as Fidelio
Liliana Meléndez as Marta
Layla Vargas as Zuleyma
Alejandro Palacios Mal Hablado
Carla Müller as Susana
Priscila Izquierdo as María Fernanda
Sheyla Gutiérrez as Bárbara
Luis Jorge Gómez as Jorge
Isaac Desiderio as Chucky
Karina Salaya as Miseria
Indina Santamaría as Rebeca
Yamil Inaty as King Kong
Yanosky Muñoz as Luis Antonio
Héctor Blanco as Héctor
Glendy Lias as Cecilia
José Carolina Seagler as Eva

References

External links 
 

Venezuelan telenovelas
Spanish-language telenovelas
TVes telenovelas
2015 Venezuelan television series debuts
2015 telenovelas
2016 Venezuelan television series endings